Riders, also called Jilly Cooper's Riders, is a British television film of 1993 based on Jilly Cooper's 1985 book of the same name in the Rutshire Chronicles series.

With a length of 199 minutes, broadcasters usually divide the production into a miniseries.

Outline
Rupert Campbell-Black (played by Marcus Gilbert) is a rich and upper class Englishman at the top of the world of international show jumping, while his arch-rival Jake Lovell (Michael Praed) is a man of humble gipsy origins now funded by his Sloane Ranger heiress wife Tory (Caroline Harker). Lovell is driven by an intense hatred of Campbell-Black, who had bullied him mercilessly as a small boy at their English prep school, and their fights over riding prizes and women reach a climax at the Los Angeles Olympics.

Production
Anglia bought the film rights to the best-selling book and hired Charlotte Bingham and her husband Terence Brady to produce a script, giving the job of director to Gabrielle Beaumont. Some sequences were filmed at Heydon, Norfolk. 
This was the screen debut of Sienna Guillory, only sixteen at the time, chosen largely because her part called for a young actress who could ride.

Reception
The film had an intense build-up as "a sex sizzler" in the weeks before its first broadcast on the ITV network on 2 May 1993, but some critics found it absurd. Writing in The Independent, Allison Pearson said: "Jilly Cooper's Riders (ITV), allegedly about mounting excitement, came with palpitating publicity. But it was all sound and furry animals, dignifying nothing." She continued by mocking Anthony Calf's portrayal of Billy Lloyd-Foxe: "I was trying to place Calf's acting style (do horses give you lockjaw?) when he turned up in the Gold Blend advert. All that rich, roasted alliteration is enough to drive anyone to suicide, which he wisely attempted in part two, only to have Rupert revive him ('England needs you, Billy').

The strapline used on the present-day DVD cover, "Sex and horses: who could ask for more?" is indeed from The Sunday Telegraph, but was a comment on the book Riders in 1985, and not on the film.

Aftermath

In 2002, Jilly Cooper revealed that Rupert Campbell-Black was a composite of Andrew Parker Bowles, Rupert Lycett Green, Michael Howard, 21st Earl of Suffolk, and the 11th Duke of Beaufort, commenting on their place in the development of Campbell-Black: "a wildly dashing and exciting group, and their bravery and charisma were the essential elements... his shittiness was entirely my invention".

Rowan Pelling has suggested in The Daily Telegraph that the outrageous Fleet Street columnist Janey Lloyd-Foxe is based on Jilly Cooper herself and the young Camilla Parker-Bowles.

Cast
Marcus Gilbert as Rupert Campbell-Black
Michael Praed as Jake Lovell
Arabella Holzbog (as Arabella Tjye) as Helen Macaulay, later Helen Campbell-Black
Caroline Harker as Tory Lovell
Anthony Calf as Billy Lloyd-Foxe
Belinda Mayne as Lavinia Greenslade
Brenda Bruce as Granny Maxwell
Sienna Guillory as Fenella Maxwell
John Standing as Malise Gordon
Timothy Morand as Humpty Hamilton
Gabrielle Beaumont as Lady Roxborough
Gareth Hunt as Commentator
Annabel Giles as Grania Pringle
Kay Callard as Nanny Campbell-Black
Stephanie Beacham as Molly Carter
Anthony Valentine as Colonel Carter
Andrew Hall as Nigel
Cécile Paoli as Laura Duparru
Serena Gordon as Janey Henderson, later Janey Lloyd-Foxe
Irma Bullough as Doctor in Maternity ward
Ian Hogg as Dudley Drabble

See also
1993 in British television
The Man Who Made Husbands Jealous (film)

Notes

External links

Riders on YouTube

1993 British television series debuts
1993 British television series endings
1990s British drama television series
British television films
ITV television dramas
1990s British television miniseries
English-language television shows
Television series by ITV Studios
Television shows produced by Anglia Television
Television shows based on British novels
Television shows set in Berkshire
Films directed by Gabrielle Beaumont
1990s English-language films